Stephanie Luciana Peloza, better known by her stage name Stef Sanjati, is a Canadian video game streamer and former video blogger and YouTube personality.

Of Croatian and Scottish descent, Sanjati is known for her transgender education videos, which are primarily aimed at other trans people as well as those who want to learn about trans-related issues. Her YouTube channel also covers topics such as mental health, relationships and fashion. Sanjati is also known for her make-up tutorials, which are especially targeted towards helping other trans women. Sanjati frequently uses YouNow to stream herself applying her make-up. Sanjati's YouTube channel has more than 594,000 subscribers, who are collectively known as the Bread Squad due to Sanjati's love of bread. Sanjati opens her videos by saying "Hello, Little Buns! Welcome back to my home!"

Sanjati has a distinctive facial appearance, with a streak of white hair and very blue eyes set further apart than most people's. This is due to a genetic condition known as Waardenburg syndrome, which she has vlogged about on her channel. Waardenburg Syndrome also caused Sanjati to be deaf in her left ear. In a 2018 BBC interview, Sanjati recounts her experience being bullied and harassed growing up, both for being feminine and for having her rare facial features. She states that she used the Internet and social media as a tool to find her "true self" and express her emotions in a safer environment.

In December 2016 Sanjati underwent facial feminization surgery. She did not allow her surgeon to alter any of her Waardenburg syndrome features. Sanjati vlogged the whole healing process on her YouTube channel.

In April 2020 Sanjati retired her YouTube channel. On January 25, 2021, Sanjati posted a video on her YouTube channel announcing she is changing the topic of her content. She said she is retiring from fashion and beauty, but will now do gaming and tech on Twitch and on a new gaming channel.

References

External links
 

LGBT YouTubers
Living people
Video bloggers
LGBT media personalities
Transgender women
1995 births
Canadian media personalities
Canadian YouTubers
People from Chatham-Kent
20th-century Canadian LGBT people
21st-century Canadian LGBT people